Eduard Friedrich Wilhelm 'Edrich' Krantz  (born 10 August 1954) is a former South African rugby union player.

Playing career
Krantz played his senior provincial rugby for the Free State and Northern Transvaal. He was a member of the Free State team that won the Currie Cup in 1976 as well as the Northern Transvaal team that won in 1980.

Krantz made his test match debut for the Springboks against the touring New Zealand side captained by Andy Leslie, on 24 July 1976 at the Kings Park Stadium in Durban and scored a try on test debut. He played one further test match for the Springboks, against the 1981 touring team from Ireland. Krantz also toured with Springboks to South America in 1980 and to New Zealand in 1981. He played 9 matches for the Springboks on tour and scored 11 tries in tour matches.

Test history

See also
List of South Africa national rugby union players – Springbok no. 487

References

1954 births
Living people
South African rugby union players
South Africa international rugby union players
Free State Cheetahs players
Blue Bulls players
People from Setsoto Local Municipality
Rugby union players from the Free State (province)
Rugby union wings